SS Oceana was a P&O passenger liner and cargo vessel, launched in 1887 by Harland and Wolff of Belfast and completed in 1888. Originally assigned to carry passengers and mail between London and Australia, she was later assigned to routes between London and British India. As a result Oceana sank off Beachy Head on the East Sussex coast, with the loss of 17 lives.

Construction
Ordered by Peninsular and Oriental Steam Navigation Company from the Harland and Wolff shipyard in Belfast as Yard No. 201, the  vessel was launched on 17 September 1887, and handed over from fitting out after running trials on 26 February 1888. She had accommodation for 250 first class passengers and 159 second class, and 4,000 mtons cargo capacity.

Operations
Oceana made her maiden voyage from London on 19 March 1888, sailing to Melbourne and Sydney via Colombo, Ceylon. After upgrading and refitting in 1904, she began her last voyage on this passage on 12 May 1905, after which she was placed on the London to Bombay route.

Author Mark Twain traveled from Sydney to Ceylon aboard Oceana in 1895 as part of his travels described in Following the Equator.  He remarked of the ship:

{{Quote|This 'Oceana' is a stately big ship, luxuriously appointed. She has spacious promenade decks. Large rooms; a surpassingly comfortable ship. The officers' library is well selected; a ship's library is not usually that . . . . For meals, the bugle call, man-of-war fashion; a pleasant change from the terrible gong.}}

Sinking

On 15 March 1912 Oceana finished loading for her next trip to Bombay in the Port of Tilbury, under the command of Captain Thomas H. Hyde, RNR. Aboard were 41 passengers, a complement of 220 crew and a pilot. She was also carrying £747,110 worth of gold and silver ingots: £3 million at 2010 values.

The next day she was proceeding west through the Strait of Dover at nearly full speed. The sea was calm although there was a strong headwind. Commissioned, owned and operated by F. Laeisz of Hamburg, she was on her way from Mejillones, Chile to Hamburg with a cargo of nitrate, sailing under full sail at a speed of almost .

The captain of Pisagua burnt a warning flare, which was seen by the crew and senior officer on duty on the bridge of Oceana, who then gave the order to turn to port. The pilot from Tilbury and for the Strait of Dover, Mr Penny, who was board Oceana in the charthouse, came to the bridge and realized that this manoeuvre would not be enough to avert a collision. He called "hard to port", but before Oceana could get out of the course, Pisagua struck Oceana amidships, making a  gash in her side.

The pilot ordered the immediate closure of all the watertight bulkhead doors on Oceana, whilst the captain ordered all crew and passengers to their boat stations to stand by to abandon ship. Sending out an immediate distress signal, the London, Brighton and South Coast Railway passenger ferry  attended the scene, while two other paddle steamers and RMS Ruahine stood by. While awaiting rescue, the crew tried to lower one of the lifeboats, but it crashed into the sea and capsized, resulting in the loss of seven passengers and ten crew. Sussex managed to take on board 241 of the remaining passengers and crew.

Although listing, Oceana was taken in tow by the Newhaven tug Alert, stern first, at 08:00. But by 10:00 she had developed an adverse list, enough to raise her propeller out of the water. Captain Hyde and the crew who had stayed aboard to help the tow now abandoned ship to the Alert, and watched from the tug as she sank in less than 20 minutes. Oceana sank close to the seaside resort town of Eastbourne in shallow water, settling on the sea bed with her masts and the tops of her funnels showing out of the sea at low tide.Pisagua drifted off leeward after the collision, but managed to survive with severe damage to the bow and foremast. Towed to Dover for immediate sea-going repairs, she was then towed to Hamburg where she was condemned. She was rebuilt as a whale factory ship and operated by Søren L. Christensen,. On 12 February 1913, Pisagua was stranded at Low Island, South Shetland Islands. Although insured for NOK 318,000, she was subsequently condemned and written off at a loss to her owners.

After the sinking, P&O sued Laeisz, claiming damages for the loss of Oceana. Judgement was given that Pisagua was not at fault, due to a combination of factors, including that Oceana was obliged to give way to Pisagua under the "steam gives way to sail" rule. The subsequent Board of Trade Inquiry, which reported on 13 July 1912, reached similar conclusions, suspended the chief officer's certificate of competency for six months and censured the master.

Bullion salvage
The day after the collision and ship's sinking, P&O agreed with the insurers' salvage team to send divers to recover the gold and silver ingots. Divers initially entered the Captain's cabin and opened his safe, to recover the keys to the ship's five strongrooms. This enabled them to open three of the five strongrooms, while the other two were opened with a lump hammer and cold chisel. The salvage operation lasted ten days. A notable history item of the day, the salvage operation was filmed by George Albert Smith of Brighton, using his new and innovative "Kinemacolor" system, the first successful colour motion picture process.

Wreck
Resting on an even keel on a gravel seabed, the bows are upright and mostly intact. Her superstructure has collapsed, but her sides are vertical and complete with portholes. Divers can see inside the engine room from above to see the four boilers and the  7,000 ihp triple-expansion steam engine. Being close to the shore, the wreck attracts a large amount of sea life.

Divers have found single gold and silver ingots since, the last being recovered in 1996. The ship was carrying a memorial plaque to 800 men of the 1st Nottingham Regiment who had died in India from 1819 to 1838, mainly from local diseases. The plaque was recovered by divers Geoff and Jamie Smith from the Tunbridge Wells Sub-Aqua Club in August 2009, and after restoration and preservation presented to 2nd Battalion the Mercian Regiment in October 2009. It is currently displayed in the regimental museum in Nottingham Castle.

See also

References

1887 ships
History of East Sussex
Maritime incidents in 1912
Ocean liners of the United Kingdom
Ships built by Harland and Wolff
Ships built in Belfast
Ships of P&O (company)
Ships sunk in collisions
Shipwrecks in the English Channel
Steamships of the United Kingdom